Handball has been an African Games event since the first edition in 1965 in Brazzaville, Republic of the Congo.

Men's tournaments

Summaries 

 A round-robin tournament determined the final standings.
 Handball tournament held in Casablanca.

Participating nations 

 Rq: The table is not complete.

Women's tournaments

Summaries 

 Handball tournament held in Casablanca.

Participating nations 

 Rq: The table is not complete.

Medal table

Men

Women

Overall

See also 
African Men's Handball Championship
African Women's Handball Championship

External links 
 Handball Africa Archive (todor66.com)
 Men's All-Africa Games handball tournament (sports123.com)
 Women's All-Africa Games handball tournament (sports123.com)

 
African Games
African Games